Famelica scipio is a species of sea snail, a marine gastropod mollusk in the family Raphitomidae.

Description
The length of the shell attains 14 mm.

Distribution
This marine species occurs off Dominica and St Vincent at depths between 227 m to 1796 m.

References

 Dall, W. H. 1889. Reports on the results of dredgings, under the supervision of Alexander Agassiz, in the Gulf of Mexico (1877-78) and in the Caribbean Sea (1879-80), by the U. S. Coast Survey Steamer 'Blake'; Bulletin of the Museum of Comparative Zoology at Harvard College vol. 18 (1889)

External links
 

scipio
Gastropods described in 1889